Hypsotropa heterocerella is a species of snout moth in the genus Hypsotropa. It was described by George Hampson in 1896 and is known from Kashmir and Punjab in India.

References

Moths described in 1896
Anerastiini
Moths of Asia